Bhabat / Pabhat is the northern part of the town in the notified area of municipality of Zirakpur, Mohali District, Punjab, India.

The postal code of Bhabat is 140603.

Hospitals and medical facilities

 Ashirwaad Hospital 
 Civil veterinary Hospital (farm and domestic Animals)
 Dashmesh Multispeciality Hospital
 Govt Ayush Hospital of Dayalpura is also adjacent
 JP Hospital
 Saini Hospital
 Trinity Hospital and Medical Research Institute

Hotels and resorts
Akm Resorts
Chandigarh Ashok
Dhillon farm
GM Resorts
Hotel Mittaso
Hotel Mandarin Square
Joshi farm
Ramada Plaza Zirakpur
Regenta Almeida Hotel

Colonies
AKS Colony 1
Aks Colony 2
Aks Colony 3
Alpine Homes
Aastha Apartments
Ansal Woodbury Homes
City Enclave
Greenview Homes
Goldstone Homes 
Greenview Heights
Highland Park Homes
Hardeep Niwas
Jarnail Enclave 1
Jarnail Enclave 2
Jarnail Enclave 3
Khushal Enclave
Khushal Enclave Extn
Leafstone Apartments
Mannat Enclave 1
Mannat Enclave 2
Mona Aeroview Apartments
Motia Homes 
Myst home
Maya Greens Apartments
Madhuban Homes
Mahavir Enclave
New Defense Colony
Onyxe Paraiso Housing Society
Palam Enclave
Riverdale Hazelwood
Satyam Swastik Vihar Apartments
Shankar City
Skynet Towers
Swastik Vihar
Shiva Enclave
Trishla city
Unicity Homes
Victoria City
Zimidara Enclave

Demographics
As of the 2001 Indian census, Males constitute 53% of the population and females 47% in the total population of the town.

Cities and towns in Rupnagar district